Walter Franklin Bond (October 19, 1937 – September 14, 1967) was an American professional baseball player who appeared in 365 games over six Major League Baseball seasons between  and  for the Cleveland Indians, Houston Colt .45s/Astros and Minnesota Twins. An outfielder and first baseman, he played the last five seasons of his 11-year professional career after being diagnosed with leukemia while serving in the United States Army in 1962. The disease eventually took Bond's life in the closing weeks of the  baseball season — a year during which he had made the Twins' roster coming out of spring training.

With his imposing size, he was an effective power hitter who also batted for average (.299) during his minor league career, and brief Negro leagues career with the Kansas City Monarchs. In 1962, the year of his diagnosis, Bond batted .320 in 132 games for the Salt Lake City Bees of the Triple-A Pacific Coast League. Then, in a 12-game September stint with the Indians, Bond hit six home runs in only 50 at bats, drove in 17 runs, batted .380 and slugged .800. Yet he could not make the 1963 Indians roster and spent that campaign in Triple-A.

On December 19, 1963, he was acquired by Houston. The Colt .45s' general manager, Paul Richards, was aware of Bond's illness, but the team doctor examined Bond and determined that his leukemia was in remission.  Bond then turned in his best Major League season as the starting first baseman for the 1964 Colt .45s, leading Houston in home runs (20) and runs batted in (85), and appearing in 148 games. The following year, Bond held onto his starting job, but his production slumped with the team's move into the Astrodome; some teammates later speculated that his leukemia had recurred that season, affecting his play. Sent to the Twins just before the  season, he returned to Triple-A and batted .316 with 18 home runs in 122 games for the Denver Bears, earning an invitation to spring training for 1967.

Bond made the team and batted .313 in part-time duty during the season's first month. His five hits included a two-run, pinch-hit home run off 20-game-winner Earl Wilson of the Detroit Tigers on April 23. But the Twins released him on May 15, and although Bond caught on with the Triple-A Jacksonville Suns, his declining health forced him to the sidelines after only three games. He entered a Houston hospital for treatment, but died there at age 29 on September 14, 1967.  Said his physician, Dr. Hatch Cummings: "He showed the strength of character and will that only champions possess. It was an exhibition of courage, and in the best tradition of baseball."

Among Bond's 307 big-league hits were 40 doubles, 11 triples and 41 homers. He was credited with 179 runs batted in.

See also
 List of baseball players who died during their careers

References

External links

Anderson, James Walter Bond: A Ballplayer Who Was Big in Stature and Big of Heart, Astros Daily

1937 births
1967 deaths
20th-century African-American sportspeople
African-American baseball players
American expatriate baseball players in Canada
American expatriate baseball players in Nicaragua
Baseball players from Tennessee
Burlington Indians players (1958–1964)
Cleveland Indians players
Cocoa Indians players
Deaths from cancer in Texas
Deaths from leukemia
Denver Bears players
Houston Astros players
Houston Colt .45s players
Jacksonville Suns players
Kansas City Monarchs players
Major League Baseball first basemen
Major League Baseball outfielders
Minnesota Twins players
People from Madison County, Tennessee
Reading Indians players
Salt Lake City Bees players
Toronto Maple Leafs (International League) players
Vancouver Mounties players